The Africa Cup for Club Champions (ACCC) is a women's field hockey competition for clubs in Africa. It was first played for in 1996.

Summaries

 A round-robin tournament determined the final standings.

Records and statistics

Performances by club

Performances by nation

See also
Hockey Africa Cup for Club Champions - Men's

References

External links
Africa Cup for Club Championships - AfHF official website

Club
Recurring sporting events established in 1998
2010 establishments in Africa
Africa